Daniel Johannes Abt (born 3 December 1992) is a German former racing driver. He has competed in such series as the German Formula Three Championship, the GP3 Series, the GP2 Series, and won the 2009 ADAC Formel Masters championship. He competed in the first four rounds of the 2019–20 Formula E season with ABT Schaeffler Audi Sport, however he was dismissed from the team after being found to be using a ringer driver in the sport's subsequent virtual races. He completed the remainder of the season at Nio 333 FE Team replacing Ma Qinghua. He is currently on a hiatus from competitive racing, having chosen to take up a broadcasting role with Sat.1 as part of their Formula E coverage.

Career

ADAC Formel Masters
Abt was born in Kempten, Bavaria. In 2008, Abt switched to formula racing and competed in the ADAC Formel Masters for his father's team, Abt Sportsline. He started from the pole position four times and clinched a third and two second places as his best results. Finishing the season in eighth place of the standings he was defeated by his team-mate Markus Pommer, who finished fifth overall with one victory to his credit. In 2009, Abt contested his second season in the ADAC Formel Masters for Abt Sportsline and with eight race wins commandingly clinched the champion's title ahead of Klaus Bachler. He took seven pole positions and a total of ten podium results. With 224 points against 90 points he clearly prevailed in the internal duel against his team-mate René Binder.

Formula Three
After running in the German Formula Three Championship as a guest entrant for Performance Racing in 2009, he switched to the series in 2010 joining the championship-winning Van Amersfoort Racing team. During the season Abt prevailed against his team-mates Stef Dusseldorp and Willi Steindl and had chances of winning the championship title up to the last race weekend. In the end, he had to admit defeat to Tom Dillmann with a score of 112 points against 120 points, and with two race wins and a total of ten podium places finished as the overall runner-up. After the season, he competed for Signature at the prestigious Macau Grand Prix. Abt was leading the race ahead of his team-mates Edoardo Mortara and Laurens Vanthoor but lost control of his vehicle and retired after an accident.

In 2011, Abt joined the Formula 3 Euro Series grid for Signature, finishing the season in seventh place after taking four third places as his best results. In the team, he was defeated by Marco Wittmann and Vanthoor, who achieved second and sixth place. Ahead of Carlos Muñoz, who finished in position eight of the standings, Abt was the third-best driver of his team. In addition, Abt was entitled to points in the 2011 FIA Formula 3 International Trophy where he achieved fourth place. At the end of the year, he tested for Audi in a DTM car.

GP3 and GP2
After setting the fastest time on several occasions in GP3 tests for Lotus GP at the end of 2011, the racing team that had provided the champion and the runner-up the year before, the team gave him a cockpit for the 2012 GP3 Series season.

On 19 December 2012 Abt got a contract to join ART Grand Prix in the GP2 Series in 2013 together with James Calado. Abt struggled as a rookie and finished the season in 22nd with only eleven points to his name, but remained in the championship for 2014 by moving to the German Hilmer Motorsport squad alongside fellow GP3 runner-up Facu Regalia.

Formula E (2014–2020)

On 13 February 2014 Abt was confirmed to also be racing in the inaugural Formula E season with his family associated team Audi Sport ABT alongside Audi's World Endurance Championship driver Lucas di Grassi.

2014–15

Having driven to 3rd on the podium in the inaugural Formula E race, Abt was penalised for illegal modifications on his car resulting being pushed down to 10th position. Abt achieved one podium finish, pole position and fastest lap in the 2014–15 season with 32 points and 11th place in the championship. Abt failed to live up to expectations in his debut season having scored 101 less than teammate Lucas Di Grassi having lacked consistency.

2017–18

Abt won his first race in Formula E in the 2018 Mexico City ePrix, after 38 race starts.

2019–20
In May 2020, Abt was suspended by the Audi team after a professional gamer played under his name in an esports version of the Formula E series. The announcement of his sacking came shortly after.

About a month later, Abt signed for the Nio 333 FE Team, replacing Ma Qinghua after travel restrictions disallowed the latter to travel to Berlin.

Hiatus from racing (2021–present)
In November 2020, Abt revealed that he had received an offer to race in the 2020-21 season of Formula E, but he declined it in favour of temporarily stepping away from motorsports. Instead, he joined Sat.1 as a TV expert and co-commentator for the channel's Formula E coverage that season. Abt was adamant that it wouldn't be "a goodbye to motorsports", but he felt that sitting out of doing any official racing for a year was "the right way" for him and that he was "looking forward to it so much."

Additional information
From 2008 to 2010, Abt was a candidate of the Deutsche Post Speed Academy. As the Academy's overall winner in 2009 and 2010 he became "Germany's motorsport talent of the year." Since 2010, Abt has also been a member of Volkswagen's talent promotion programme.

Personal life
Besides Daniel Abt, other members of his family are involved in motorsport. His father, Hans-Jürgen, is the owner and principal of the Abt Sportsline team which is active in the DTM and other series. His family also owns a German auto tuning company which primarily works on Audis. His uncle, Christian Abt, is a racing driver as well and was active in the DTM for a number of years.

Abt is managing director of Abt Lifestyle GmbH.

Racing record

Career summary

Complete ADAC Formel Masters results
(key) (Races in bold indicate pole position) (Races in italics indicate fastest lap)

Complete Formula 3 Euro Series results
(key)

Complete GP3 Series results
(key) (Races in bold indicate pole position)

Complete Formula Renault 3.5 Series results  
(key)

Complete GP2 Series results
(key)

Complete Formula E results
(key) (Races in bold indicate pole position; races in italics indicate fastest lap)

† Driver did not finish the race, but was classified as he completed over 90% of the race distance.

24 Hours of Le Mans results

Complete FIA World Endurance Championship results

References

External links

 
 

1992 births
Living people
People from Kempten im Allgäu
Sportspeople from Swabia (Bavaria)
Racing drivers from Bavaria
German racing drivers
German Formula Three Championship drivers
24 Hours of Le Mans drivers
ADAC Formel Masters drivers
Formula 3 Euro Series drivers
German GP3 Series drivers
GP2 Series drivers
Formula E drivers
FIA World Endurance Championship drivers
ADAC GT Masters drivers
ART Grand Prix drivers
24H Series drivers
World Series Formula V8 3.5 drivers
Abt Sportsline drivers
Performance Racing drivers
Van Amersfoort Racing drivers
Tech 1 Racing drivers
Signature Team drivers
Carlin racing drivers
Rebellion Racing drivers
NIO 333 FE Team drivers
Audi Sport drivers
Hilmer Motorsport drivers